Mahavira: The Hero of Nonviolence is an illustrated children's story based upon the life of Mahavira, a teacher of the Jain faith.

Synopsis
Mahavira: The Hero of Nonviolence is a story of a young prince, Mahavira, who was destined to teach peace and non-violence. He was born in India and his name was Vardhaman. As he grew he learned through books and wanted to become a monk. He acquired knowledge through his spiritual journey and achieved the three spiritual jewels. In the Jainism faith they were called right faith, right knowledge and right conduct. He loved all living things. He had no fear. Others in later years that practiced peace were Gandhi and Dr. Martin Luther King.

Awards
USA Best Books Awards 2014 – Children's Religious (Winner) – "Mahavira: The Hero of Nonviolence by Manoj Jain, illustrated by Demi" Wisdom Tales Press 
Midwest Book Awards 2014 – Children's Nonfiction (Gold Medal) – "Mahavira: The Hero of Nonviolence by Manoj Jain, illustrated by Demi" Wisdom Tales Press 
Skipping Stones Honor Award 2015 – Multicultural & International Books (Honor Award) – "Mahavira: The Hero of Nonviolence by Manoj Jain, illustrated by Demi" Wisdom Tales Press

References

External links 

 Jain, Manoj Mahavira: The Hero of Nonviolence.   World Wisdom, Incorporated, 2014.
 Good Reads
 Manoj Jain MD Author's website

2014 children's books
American picture books
English-language books
2014 non-fiction books
Children's non-fiction books
Jain texts